Kady MacDonald Denton (born 22 July 1941) is a Canadian creator of  children's books, primarily an illustrator of picture books. She observed in 2011 that "I'm in that quickly-shrinking group of illustrators who doesn’t use a computer at any stage in the illustration process."

Life
Denton was born in Winnipeg, Manitoba, and raised in Toronto, Ontario. She studied at the University of Toronto, the Banff School of Fine Arts, and the Chelsea School of Art. She and her husband live in Peterborough, Ontario.

Career

Early in the 1990s Denton illustrated three Kingfisher collections of retellings by Ann Pilling, which have been reissued. For another Kingfisher collection several years later, A Child's Treasury of Nursery Rhymes, she won the 1998 Governor General's Award for English language children's illustration, and also the 1999 Amelia Frances Howard-Gibbon Illustrator's Award and Elizabeth Mrazik-Cleaver Canadian Picture Book Awards. Previously, she had won the Amelia Frances Howard-Gibbon award for 'Til All the Stars Have Fallen: Canadian Poems for Children, edited by David Booth. She won the Mrazik-Cleaver award again in 2006 for Snow, written by Joan Clark.

The Children's Literature Association named Would They Love a Lion? (Kingfisher, 1995), which Denton both wrote and illustrated, as an Honor Winner of the 2015 Phoenix Picture Book Award, which annually recognises a picture book with lasting value that did not win a major award 20 years earlier. "Books are considered not only for the quality of their illustrations, but for the way pictures and text work together."

Selected works

As illustrator
 What Are You Doing, Benny? by Cary Fagan (Tundra, 2019) 
The Bear and Mouse series by Bonny Becker (Candlewick)
A Christmas for Bear (Sep 2017), 
A Library Book for Bear (Jul 2014), 
A Birthday for Bear (Sep 2012), 
The Sniffles for Bear (Sep 2011), 
A Bedtime for Bear (Sep 2010), 
A Visitor for Bear (Feb 2008), 
The Good-Pie Party, by Liz Gartlon Scanlon (Arthur A. Levine, Mar 2014), 
The Queen of France, by Tim Wadham, (Candlewick, Mar 2011), 
You're Mean, Lily Jean!, by Frieda Wishinsky (North Winds, Sep 2009)
A Sea-Wishing Day, by Robert Heidbreder
Snow, by Joan Clark
A Second Is a Hiccup: A Child's Book of Time, by Hazel Hutchins
I Gave My Mom a Castle, by Jean Little
Amber Waiting, by Nan Gregory
Elephant Child, by Mary Ellis
In the Light of the Moon and Other Bedtime Stories, by Sam McBratney
Two Homes, by Clare Masurel
I Wished for a Unicorn, by Robert Heidbreder
The Arctic Fox, by Mary Ellis
If I Were Your Father, by Margaret Park Bridges
If I Were Your Mother, by Margaret Park Bridges
The Umbrella Party, by Janet Lunn
Toes Are to Tickle, by Shen Roddie
The Kingfisher Children's Bible: Stories from the Old and New Testaments, retold by Ann Pilling
Realms of Gold: Myths and Legends from Around the World, by Ann Pilling
Jenny and Bob, by David Wynn Millward
The Travelling Musicians, retold by P.K. Page
Before I Go to Sleep: Bible Stories, Poems and Prayers for Children, selected and retold by Ann Pilling
The Story of Little Quack, by Betty Gibson
'Til All the Stars Have Fallen: Canadian Poems for Children, selected by David Booth
The Ned series by Pam Zinneman-Hope
Find Your Coat, Ned
Let's Play Ball, Ned
Let's Go Shopping, Ned
Time for Bed, Ned

As author and illustrator
A Child's Treasury of Nursery Rhymes (1998)
Watch Out, William! (1996)
Would They Love a Lion? (1995)
The Christmas Boot (1990)
Janet's Horses (1990)
Dorothy's Dream (1989)
Granny Is a Darling (1988)
The Picnic (1988)

Notes

References

External links
 
 Kady MacDonald Denton at Macmillan Publishers, Kingfisher imprint
 

1941 births
Artists from Toronto
Artists from Winnipeg
Canadian children's book illustrators
Canadian children's writers
Governor General's Award-winning children's illustrators
Living people
Canadian women artists
Canadian women children's writers
Writers from Toronto
Writers from Winnipeg